Aziza Chakir (born 19 May 1998) is a Moroccan judoka. She is a bronze medalist at the African Games and a three-time medalist at the African Judo Championships. She is also a bronze medalist at the Jeux de la Francophonie.

Career 

In 2017, she competed in the women's 48 kg event at the World Judo Championships held in Budapest, Hungary. She also competed in the women's 48 kg event at the 2018 Mediterranean Games held in Tarragona, Spain.

In 2020, she won the silver medal in women's 48 kg event at the African Judo Championships held in Antananarivo, Madagascar. 

In January 2021, she competed in the women's 48 kg event at the Judo World Masters held in Doha, Qatar. At the 2021 African Judo Championships held in Dakar, Senegal, she lost her bronze medal match in her event. In June 2021, she was eliminated in her first match in the women's 48 kg event at the World Judo Championships held in Budapest, Hungary.

Achievements

References

External links 
 

Living people
1998 births
Moroccan female judoka
Place of birth missing (living people)
Mediterranean Games competitors for Morocco
Competitors at the 2018 Mediterranean Games
African Games medalists in judo
African Games bronze medalists for Morocco
Competitors at the 2019 African Games
21st-century Moroccan women